Antonio Castriani (surname also given as Crastini) (c.1460 – August 11, 1510) was an Italian Roman Catholic bishop.

Biography
On March 17, 1506, Antonio Castriani was appointed as Bishop of Cagli but this term was short-lived. He was reappointed to become the first Bishop of Montefeltro on May 21, 1507, a position he held until his death on August 11, 1510.

References

External links and additional sources
 (for Chronology of Bishops) 
 (for Chronology of Bishops) 
 (for Chronology of Bishops) 
 (for Chronology of Bishops) 

Bishops of Montefeltro
Year of birth missing
1510 deaths